Chocolate Babies is a 1996 American film directed by Stephen Winter. The film follows a group of queer activists of color in New York City that implemented actions against conservative politicians in response to the AIDS epidemic in the 1990s within African American communities.

Cast 

 Dudley Findlay Jr. - Larva 
 Bryan Webster - Councilman Melvin Freeman
 Gregg Ferguson - Jamela
 Claude E. Sloan - Max
 Jon Kit Lee - Sam
 Michael Lynch - Lady Marmalade
 Sean Barr - Red Haired Politician
 Jon Kit Lee

Release 
The film premiered on 21 July 1996 at Outfest in Los Angeles. The film's world premiere at the 47th Berlin International Film Festival in the section Panorama. Despite receiving praise and critical acclaim at festivals, the film didn't receive a wide distribution. Winters commented on this: "Unless some company gave it some kind of credence and distribution and allowed it to be seen by people, beyond here and there, it wasn’t going to be seen."

In September 2021, the film was taken up as a Criterion Classic by the Criterion Channel.

Critical reception 
The film received the Honorable Mention for Narrative Feature in 1997 at the SXSW Film Festival as well as the award for best feature at New York Lesbian, Gay, Bisexual, & Transgender Film Festival 1997. The film also received a Honorable Mention at Urbanworld Film Festival.

Film historian Elizabeth Purchell included the film in a selection of "underseen (or just plain forgotten)" queer films.

References

External links 
 

1996 films
1996 LGBT-related films
American independent films
LGBT African-American culture
American LGBT-related films
Films shot in New York City
Historiography of LGBT in New York City
HIV/AIDS in American films
African-American LGBT-related films
African-American films
1996 independent films
1990s English-language films
1990s American films